Sunshine of Paradise Alley is a 1926 American silent drama film directed by Jack Nelson and starring Barbara Bedford, Kenneth MacDonald, and Max Davidson.

Cast
 Barbara Bedford as Sunshine O'Day 
 Kenneth MacDonald as Jerry Sullivan 
 Max Davidson as Solomon Levy 
 Nigel Barrie as Stanley Douglas 
 Gayne Whitman as Glen Wathershoon 
 Lucille Lee Stewart as Gladys Waldroon 
 Tui Bow as Queenie May 
 J. Parks Jones as Chet Hawkins 
 Bobby Nelson as Bum 
 Frank Weed as Daddy O'Day 
 Max Asher
 Evelyn Sherman
 Leon Holmes
 Monty O'Grady as Little Boy 
 Helene Pirie as Aggie

References

Bibliography
 Donald W. McCaffrey & Christopher P. Jacobs. Guide to the Silent Years of American Cinema. Greenwood Publishing, 1999.

External links
 

1926 films
1926 drama films
1920s English-language films
American silent feature films
Silent American drama films
Films directed by Jack Nelson
American black-and-white films
1920s American films